Van Delft officially named Van Delft Biscuits is a Dutch producer of cookies and Sinterklaas products. it produces 3 billion kruidnoten/year and is the largest kruidnoten producer in the world.
Van Delft company was founded by Jan van Delft in Koog aan de Zaan. In the 1970's it was market leader in Ontbijtkoek.
In 2020 Van Delft Biscuits opened a new factory in Harderwijk.

Brands 

 De Pepernotenfabriek
 Yoghurt FruitBars
 Cafe Noir
 Jungle Koeken
 Likkoeken
 Bruintjes
 Breakfast Biscuit Milk & Cereals

External links/sources 
 Website van Van Delft Biscuits
 DPG Media Privacy Gate
 Deze pepernotenbakker heeft zijn internationale doorbraak te pakken
 Delft bv, Van [ZaanWiki]

References

Companies of the Netherlands